Eucomis autumnalis, the autumn pineapple flower, or autumn pineapple lily, is a species of flowering plant in the family Asparagaceae, subfamily Scilloideae, native to Malawi, Zimbabwe and southern Africa. It is a mid to late summer flowering deciduous bulbous perennial. The green, yellow or white flowers are arranged in a spike (raceme), topped by a "head" of green leaflike bracts. It is grown as an ornamental garden plant and can also be used as a cut flower.

Description
Like other Eucomis species, it has a basal rosette of strap-shaped leaves. The filaments of the stamens are joined at the base to form a slightly cup-shaped structure. The plant has no purple coloration. The structure of the seed capsule distinguishes the two subspecies: E. autumnalis subsp. autumnalis has a thin-walled and often somewhat inflated capsule; E. autumnalis subsp. clavata has a capsule with a hard double-layered wall (pericarp). It also has a somewhat club-shaped (clavate) scape, narrowing towards the base.

Taxonomy
Eucomis autumnalis was first described by Philip Miller in 1768, as Fritillaria autumnalis. It was formally transferred to Eucomis by Frederick James Chittenden in 1951. The specific epithet autumnalis refers to its flowering and fruiting time, and distinguishes it from Eucomis regia which flowers in early spring. It is one of a group of larger tetraploid species of Eucomis, with 2n = 4x = 60.

Subspecies
The species includes two subspecies:
 Eucomis autumnalis subsp. autumnalis
 Eucomis autumnalis subsp. clavata 
E. undulata (the specific epithet referring to the wavy-edged leaves) is a name sometimes used, but is now regarded as a synonym of E. autumnalis subsp. autumnalis.
An earlier recognized subspecies, E. autumnalis subsp. amaryllidifolia, is now accepted as a separate species, Eucomis amaryllidifolia.

Distribution and habitat
Eucomis autumnalis is found from Malawi to the Cape Provinces of South Africa. E. autumnalis subsp. autumnalis has been recorded from Malawi, Zimbabwe, and, in South Africa, from the Northern Provinces, the Free State and the Cape Provinces. E. autumnalis subsp. clavata has a more central distribution, being found in Botswana, Eswatini, Lesotho, KwaZulu-Natal, the Free State and the Northern Provinces.

E. autumnalis subsp. clavata tends to be found at high altitudes. On the Drakensberg escarpment, it grows in grassland at  where it is subject to cold winters and exposure.

Cultivation
Eucomis autumnalis is grown as an ornamental plant. The flowers and later the fruiting stems remain decorative for many weeks, and can be used as cut flowers. It grows and flowers best planted in full sun or partial shade in a fertile soil, and kept well watered during the summer period of growth and flowering.

A cultivar is available under the name "E. autumnalis 'White Dwarf'". However, the RHS Plant Finder regards this as a cultivar of E. zambesiaca rather than E. autumnalis.

Propagation
Eucomis autumnalis can be propagated from seed sown in spring, but may take up to five seasons to flower. The bulb may produce offsets, which can be removed while the plant is dormant. The bulblets can then be planted the following spring. Leaf cuttings can be taken while the plant is in active growth. If sections of  each are planted in sterilised and well-drained soil and kept in a humid environment, tiny bulbs should form within a few months. Sterilised bulb scales, leaf bases or flower stalks can also be used in tissue culture.

Chemistry 
The homo-isoflavones 4′-o-methyl-punctatin, autumnalin and 3,9-dihydro-autumnalin can be found in E. autumnalis.

Notes and references

External links
 
 

Scilloideae
Plants described in 1768
Flora of Southern Africa
Flora of Malawi
Flora of Zimbabwe
Garden plants of Southern Africa